Mykolas is a Lithuanian male given name derived from Michael. People with the name include:

Mykolas Arlauskas (born 1930), agronomist, professor of biomedicine and signatory of 1990 Act of the Re-Establishment of the State of Lithuania
Mykolas Biržiška (1882–1962), Lithuanian editor, historian, professor of literature, diplomat & politician; signatory of Act of Independence of Lithuania
Mykolas Burokevičius (1927–2016), communist political leader in Lithuania
Mykolas Kęsgaila (died 1451), Lithuanian nobleman, a precursor of the Kęsgailos family
Mykolas Kęsgaila (died 1476), Lithuanian nobleman from Kęsgailos family
Mykolas Krupavičius 1885–1970), Lithuanian priest and politician 
Mykolas Natalevičius (born 1985), Lithuanian composer
Mykolas Ruzgys (1915–19??), Lithuanian basketball player
Mykolas Sleževičius (born 1882), Lithuanian lawyer, politician, journalist, interpreter, actor and director of noble Lithuanian extraction

See also
Mikalojus, name derived from Nicholas but often confused with Mykolas

Lithuanian masculine given names